Shurley is a surname. Notable people with the surname include:

George Shurley (1569–1647), English judge, Lord Chief Justice of Ireland
John Shurley (disambiguation), multiple people

See also
 Hurley (surname)
 Shirley (name)